= 1885 Swiss constitutional referendum =

Vote on constitutional amendments regarding alcohol and economic policy

25 October 1885
- Federal decree regarding the partial amendment of the Federal Constitution of the Swiss Confederation (economy and alcohol issue)

Results
Choice	Votes	%
Yes	230,250	59.39%
No	157,463	40.61%
Valid votes	387,713	100.00%
Invalid or blank votes	0	0.00%
Total votes	387,713	100.00%
Registered voters/turnout	641,689	60.42%

A constitutional referendum was held in Switzerland on 25 October 1885. The constitutional amendments were approved by 59% of voters and a majority of cantons.

== Background ==
In order to pass, any amendments to the constitution needed a double majority; a majority of the popular vote and majority of the cantons. The decision of each canton was based on the vote in that canton. Full cantons counted as one vote, whilst half cantons counted as half.

== Results ==
Choice	Popular vote		Cantons		
Choice	Votes	%	Full	Half	Total
For	230,250	59.4	13	4	15
Against	157,463	40.6	6	2	7
Invalid/blank votes		–	–	–	–
Total	387,713	100	19	6	22
Registered voters/turnout	641,689		–	–	–
Source: Nohlen & Stöver
